The 1981 Vuelta a España was the 36th edition of the Vuelta a España, one of cycling's Grand Tours. The Vuelta began in Santander, with a prologue individual time trial on 21 April, and Stage 9 occurred on 30 April with a stage to Murcia. The race finished in Madrid on 10 May.

Prologue
21 April 1981 — Santander to Santander,  (ITT)

Stage 1
22 April 1981 — Santander to Avilés,

Stage 2
23 April 1981 — Avilés to León,

Stage 3
24 April 1981 — León to Salamanca,

Stage 4
25 April 1981 — Salamanca to Cáceres,

Stage 5
26 April 1981 — Cáceres to Mérida,

Stage 6
27 April 1981 — Mérida to Seville,

Stage 7
28 April 1981 — Écija to Jaén,

Stage 8a
29 April 1981 — Jaén to Granada,

Stage 8b
29 April 1981 — Granada to Sierra Nevada,  (ITT)

Stage 9
30 April 1981 — Baza to Murcia,

References

1981 Vuelta a España
Vuelta a España stages